Jo-Carroll Dennison (December 16, 1923 – October 18, 2021) was an American actress and model who was Miss America 1942.

Early years
Dennison was born on December 16, 1923, in Florence, Arizona, the daughter of Elizabeth (née Brownd) and Harry Arthur Dennison, who ran a travelling medicine show in Texas. She was born in the infirmary of a men's state prison in Arizona, delivered by the prison doctor as he was the only medical help her travelling parents could find. Her father had wanted her to be born in California so the couple had been driving west from Texas when her mother went into labour.

Her family later lived in San Francisco, Santa Barbara, California, and Tyler, Texas. She graduated from Hale Center High School in 1940, and was a stenographer in Tyler.

Pageantry
Dennison was crowned Miss America September 12, 1942, after having entered the contest as Miss Texas. She had earlier won both the talent and the swimsuit competitions in the contest. As Miss America during World War II, much of her time was spent visiting "Defence plants, hospitals and service camps" and selling war bonds.

Film career
After her time as Miss America, Dennison went to Hollywood. On November 18, 1942, 20th Century Fox signed her to a seven-year contract. She had roles in Winged Victory and The Jolson Story.

Personal life
Dennison married comedian Phil Silvers on March 2, 1945. They divorced March 8, 1950. The union produced no children. Dennison later married television producer Russell Stoneham and had two sons, Peter and John, with him. She lived in Idyllwild, California, in the San Jacinto Mountains.

Dennison died from chronic obstructive pulmonary disease on October 18, 2021, at the age of 97.

Filmography

References

External links

Jo-Carroll Dennison  at Miss America

1923 births
2021 deaths
20th Century Studios contract players
American film actresses
Miss America 1940s delegates
Miss America Preliminary Talent winners
Miss America winners
People from Tyler, Texas